Amy Abigail Nuttall (born 7 June 1982) is an English actress and singer known for playing Chloe Atkinson in the ITV soap opera Emmerdale from 2000 until 2005 and housemaid Ethel Parks in the ITV period drama Downton Abbey.

Early life
Nuttall was born in Blackburn, Lancashire. She was educated at Bury Grammar School for Girls and trained at Tring Park School for the Performing Arts. She performed with the National Youth Music Theatre, notably playing the lead role of Princess Ismene in Aurelius  at the Tyne Opera House, Newcastle and the Assembly Rooms in Edinburgh in August 1997.

Career
Nuttall is credited as the youngest actress to ever understudy and play the lead role of Christine in The Phantom of the Opera (at age 17) (National Tour), has sung at the Royal Albert Hall, Royal Festival Hall and Old Trafford and won an edition of Celebrity Stars in Their Eyes as Sarah Brightman.

Shortly before leaving Emmerdale, Nuttall appeared in Notes from New York at the Trafalgar Studios opposite Jon Lee and Julie Atherton. In 2005, she released her debut album as a classical vocalist, Best Days, on EMI Classics and filmed music videos for her tracks "Best Days", "No Greater Gift" and a version of "Scarborough Fair", which was heavily requested on Classic FM TV. Best Days peaked at number four in the UK classical chart and was nominated for Album of the Year at the 2006 Classic BRIT Awards.

In the same year, Nuttall took part in the reality TV programme Celebrity Shark Bait, which also featured Richard E Grant and Ruby Wax and appeared in Celebrate Oliver, a musical special for BBC1.

In the autumn of 2005, Nuttall toured the UK extensively as Eliza Doolittle in My Fair Lady to critical acclaim. She shared the role with Lisa O'Hare on the National Tour due to other commitments with her first album. The tour started on 5 October 2005 at the Palace Theatre in Manchester and ended on 12 August 2006 at the Wales Millennium Centre in Cardiff.

In January 2007, Nuttall performed on BBC Radio 2's Friday Night is Music Night with an 80-piece live orchestra and in May 2007, she joined the cast of the stage revival of Boeing-Boeing at the Comedy Theatre opposite Patricia Hodge, Mark Rylance and Roger Allam. On 2 October 2007, Nuttall replaced Kim Medcalf in the London production of Cabaret at the Lyric Theatre, transferring directly from her role in Boeing-Boeing. In April 2008, Nuttall's initial six-month contract was extended until the production's closure on 21 June. Nuttall appeared in Hotel Babylon in 2009 as Melanie Hughes, the new hotel receptionist.

In June and July 2010, Nuttall played one of the lead roles in the revival of the hit musical The Hired Man at the Octagon Theatre, Bolton. Later that year, she returned to the Octagon Theatre, Bolton to play Stella Kowalski in the Tennessee Williams classic A Streetcar Named Desire. She shared the role of the Lady of the Lake in the UK tour of Spamalot, which began on 18 October 2010 at the Edinburgh Playhouse. From September 2011, Nuttall began appearing in the second series of Downton Abbey, appearing as the new maid, Ethel.

In December 2011, she appeared in Noises Off at London's Old Vic until March 2012. On 14 July 2011, Nuttall was awarded an Honorary Degree of Doctor of Arts by the University of Bolton. On 8 June 2013, Nuttall starred in the Saturday Drama on BBC Radio 4. Entitled The Weather Girl, she played the lead role of Abigail, a prisoner whose mental state is assessed by a clinical psychologist.

In 2019, Nuttall lent her voice to Olga in HISTORY's podcast Letters of Love in WW2 - a series based on the real-life letters of a couple separated by the Second World War.

Personal life
Nuttall dated fellow Emmerdale cast member Ben Freeman for four years. She married long-term boyfriend, the actor Andrew Buchan, on 8 September 2012. They have two children, a daughter and a son. In February 2023, it was reported Nuttall and Buchan had split up before Christmas.

Filmography

Awards and nominations

References

External links

Scarborough Fair Video

1982 births
Living people
People from Blackburn
English television actresses
English stage actresses
English women singers
English musical theatre actresses
People educated at Bury Grammar School (Girls)
People educated at Tring Park School for the Performing Arts
Actresses from Lancashire
21st-century English actresses
20th-century English actresses